If Music Be the Food of Love... Prepare for Indigestion is the second studio album by English rock band Dave Dee, Dozy, Beaky, Mick & Tich, released on 10 November 1966. It features the singles "Hideaway", "You Make It Move" and "Bend It!". Unlike the band's debut album, it failed to reach the top 20 of the UK Albums Chart, peaking at number 37. Reviewing the album for Allmusic, Lindsay Planer described If Music Be the Food of Love... as "another batch of strong Brit-pop compositions" and praised the band's sense of humour and "sharp musicality".

Track listing

Personnel
Dave Dee, Dozy, Beaky, Mick & Tich
Dave Dee – vocals
Ian "Tich" Amey – lead guitar
John "Beaky" Dymond – rhythm guitar
Trevor "Dozy" Davies – bass
Mick Wilson – drums

See also
Orsino (Twelfth Night) for the phrase "If Music Be the Food of Love"

References

External links 
 
 

1966 albums
Dave Dee, Dozy, Beaky, Mick & Tich albums
Fontana Records albums